Count  was a field marshal in the Imperial Japanese Army and Japanese Governor General of Korea from 1916 to 1919. His Japanese decorations included Order of the Golden Kite (1st class) and Order of the Chrysanthemum.

Biography
Hasegawa was born as the son of a samurai fencing master in the Iwakuni sub-fief of Chōshū (present-day Yamaguchi Prefecture), Hasegawa served under the Chōshū forces during the Boshin War from January until March 1868 during the Meiji Restoration which overthrew the Tokugawa shogunate.

Upon the formation of the Imperial Japanese Army in 1871, Hasegawa was commissioned a captain.  Later, as a major, he was given command of a regiment during the Satsuma Rebellion, and saw action at the relief of Kumamoto Castle on 14 April 1877.

He traveled to France as military attaché in 1885 to study European military strategy, military tactics and equipment.  Upon his return to Japan the following year, Hasegawa was promoted to major general.

During the First Sino-Japanese War, Hasegawa won distinction for valor on behalf of his 12th Infantry Brigade at the Battle of Pyongyang on 15 September 1894 and in skirmishes around Haicheng from December 1894 until January 1895. After the war, he was ennobled with the title of danshaku (baron) under the kazoku  peerage system.

During the Russo-Japanese War, Hasegawa was assigned to the First Army under General Kuroki Tamemoto as commander of the Imperial Guards Division in the spring of 1904.  He later fought with distinction at the Battle of the Yalu on 30 April – 1 May 1904, and was soon after promoted to general in June 1904.

He was commander of the Korea Garrison Army from September 1904 until December 1908. In 1907, Hasegawa was elevated to the title of shishaku (viscount).  Hasegawa was appointed Chief of Staff of the Imperial Japanese Army General Staff in 1912. He forced War Minister Uehara Yūsaku to resign over Prime Minister Saionji Kinmochi's tight fiscal policy and attempted revision of the system whereby only active duty officers would be able to serve as Ministers of War and Navy. The collapse of Saionji’s government was known as the "Taishō Political Crisis".

In 1915, Hasegawa was awarded the title of field marshal, and was elevated to the title of hakushaku (count) in 1916. From October 1916, he served as the second Japanese Governor-General of Korea, and was later criticized for his military approach to the Samil Independence Movement.

Hasegawa died in 1924. His grave is at Aoyama Cemetery in Aoyama, Minato, Tokyo.

Notes

References
 Craig, Albert M. Chōshū in the Meiji Restoration. Cambridge: Harvard University Press, 1961. OCLC 482814571
 Dupuy, Trevor N. The Harper Encyclopedia of Military Biography. New York: HarperCollins Publishers Inc., 1992. 
 Jansen, Marius B. and Gilbert Rozman, eds. (1986). Japan in Transition: from Tokugawa to Meiji. Princeton: Princeton University Press. ;  OCLC 12311985
  . (2000). The Making of Modern Japan. Cambridge: Harvard University Press. ;  OCLC 44090600
 Nussbaum, Louis-Frédéric and Käthe Roth. (2005).  Japan encyclopedia. Cambridge: Harvard University Press. ;  OCLC 58053128

External links 

Governors-General of Korea
Japanese generals
Marshals of Japan
Kazoku
Japanese military personnel of the First Sino-Japanese War
Japanese military personnel of the Russo-Japanese War
People of the Boshin War
People of Meiji-period Japan
People from Yamaguchi Prefecture
1850 births
1924 deaths